The Prior of Blantyre (later Commendator of Blantyre) was the head of the medieval community of Augustinian canons based at Blantyre Priory (in modern South Lanarkshire). It was founded between 1239 and 1248, but the first prior is not known by name until 1296. Few of the priors are known thereafter until records become more extensive in the 16th century. The following is a list of known priors and commendators:

List of priors

 William de Cokeburne, 1296–1304
 John de Eglinton, 1380–1381
 William Forfare, 1430
 William Fressell, 1451
 William Bassindene, 1451 - c. 1472
 John Cavers, 1472
 John Bassindene, 1472–1476
 John Turnbull, 1476
 William Busby, x 1489
 William Bell, 1489–1508
 John Aitkenhead, 1506
 Robert Cottis, 1508–1536
 John Cessford, 1509–1512
 William Cottis, 1536
 Robert Cottis junior, 1534–1536
 James Salmond, 1536–1545
 John Donaldi (mac Donald/Donaldson), 1538–1541
 John Moncreif, 1538–1547
 Thomas Hugonis, x 1543
 John Roull, 1547–1549
 John Hamilton, 1549–1552
 William Chrysyde (Chrinside), 1552–1567
 John Hamilton, 1567

List of commendators

 Walter Stewart, 1577–1599

Notes

Bibliography
 Cowan, Ian B. & Easson, David E., Medieval Religious Houses: Scotland With an Appendix on the Houses in the Isle of Man, Second Edition, (London, 1976), p. 89
 Watt, D.E.R. & Shead, N.F. (eds.), The Heads of Religious Houses in Scotland from the 12th to the 16th Centuries, The Scottish Records Society, New Series, Volume 24, (Edinburgh, 2001), pp. 21–4

See also
 Blantyre Priory
 Lord Blantyre

Blantyre
Blantyre
People associated with South Lanarkshire
Blantyre, South Lanarkshire